Alfred John Bencini (23 March 1917 – 6 October 1991) was a Maltese sprinter. He competed in the men's 100 metres at the 1936 Summer Olympics.

References

External links
 

1917 births
1991 deaths
Athletes (track and field) at the 1936 Summer Olympics
Maltese male sprinters
Olympic athletes of Malta
Place of birth missing